American Joint Committee for Assisting Japanese-American Orphans is an American private agency responsible for intracountry adoptions of Japanese-American children after World War II.  See also Sweden v. Yamaguchi

External links 
Adoption History Project

Joint committees
Japan–United States relations
Japanese-American history